Irene Kwok (born 12 October 1933) is a Hong Kong former breaststroke swimmer. She competed in the women's 200 metre breaststroke at the 1952 Summer Olympics. She was the first woman to represent Hong Kong at the Olympics.

References

External links
 

1933 births
Living people
Hong Kong female breaststroke swimmers
Olympic swimmers of Hong Kong
Swimmers at the 1952 Summer Olympics
Place of birth missing (living people)